Dan Wilcox is an American producer and screenwriter. He won one and was nominated for four more Primetime Emmy Awards. Wilcox wrote the series finale "Goodbye, Farewell and Amen" of the television series M*A*S*H, along with Alan Alda, Burt Metcalfe, John Rappaport, Thad Mumford, Elias Davis, David Pollock and Karen Hall. In 2017, he received the Morgan Cox Award from the Writers Guild of America West.

References

External links 

Living people
Year of birth missing (living people)
Place of birth missing (living people)
American television producers
American male screenwriters
American television writers
American male television writers
20th-century American screenwriters
Primetime Emmy Award winners